Luis Alberto Moreno Mejía (born 3 May 1953) is a Colombian businessman and former diplomat who served as president of the Inter-American Development Bank (IADB) from 2005 to 2020. He was Colombia's Ambassador to the United States under president Andrés Pastrana Arango and the former President of the Instituto de Fomento Industrial.

Early life and education
Moreno was born in Philadelphia to a Colombian father who at the time was attending medical school at the University of Pennsylvania. He was raised in Bogota, where he studied at Colegio San Carlos and returned to the United States to attend college. He obtained bachelor's degrees in Business Administration and Economics from Florida Atlantic University in 1975 and an MBA from the Thunderbird School of Global Management (now part of Arizona State University) in 1977.

Career

Early career
Moreno was Executive Producer of "TV Hoy", an award-winning news program, from January 1982 to September 1990. For his distinguished work in the field of journalism, he was awarded a Nieman Fellowship by Harvard University.

Government
During the administration of Colombian President César Gaviria, Moreno worked in several cabinet positions. Moreno was the President of the Instituto de Fomento Industrial (IFI) which was a holding company for many of the largest state-owned enterprises. While at IFI, he pushed for a large privatization plan in the country. He was later appointed Minister of Economic Development.
 
In 1998, Moreno was named Colombia's Ambassador to the United States by newly elected president Andrés Pastrana Arango. He was the ambassador for seven years and oversaw a dramatic improvement in Colombian-U.S. relations. He helped build bipartisan support in the United States Congress for passage of more than US$4 billion in U.S. assistance programs for Colombia. He also worked on a free trade accord between Colombia and the United States.

Inter-American Development Bank
In 2005, Moreno was nominated for president of the IDB by the administration of President Álvaro Uribe. He took office in October that same year. He was re-elected in 2010 and again in 2015. Milestones during Moreno's tenure include: the approval in 2007 of $4.4 billion in debt relief for Bolivia, Guyana, Haiti, Honduras and Nicaragua, the most heavily indebted member countries; the approval in 2010 of the Ninth General Capital Increase, the largest expansion of resources in the Bank’s history; the merging and expansion in 2016 of the Group’s private-sector operations under IDB Invest; the replenishment in 2017 of IDB Lab with historic contributions from Latin American and Caribbean countries; the launch in 2019 of a special grant facility to help countries integrate migrants into local communities and contribute to their development; and the institution-wide response in 2020 to the coronavirus pandemic.

Later career
In early 2021, Moreno was appointed by the G20 to the High Level Independent Panel (HLIP) on financing the global commons for pandemic preparedness and response, co-chaired by Ngozi Okonjo-Iweala, Tharman Shanmugaratnam and Lawrence Summers.

Other activities
 End Malaria Council, Member (since 2017)
 International Olympic Committee (IOC), Member (since 2015)
 World Economic Forum (WEF), Member of the Board of Trustees (since 2011)

Recognition
In 2017, Moreno received the Distinguished Leadership Award for Social Equity from the Inter-American Dialogue.

Personal life
Moreno is married to María Gabriela Sigala, a Venezuelan philanthropist. He has two children, Nicolas and Natalia.

References

 

 

1953 births
Living people
Politicians from Philadelphia
Florida Atlantic University alumni
Nieman Fellows
Colombian businesspeople
Colombian journalists
Male journalists
Colombian Ministers of Economic Development
Ambassadors of Colombia to the United States
Knights Grand Cross of the Order of Isabella the Catholic
Presidents of the Inter-American Development Bank
Thunderbird School of Global Management alumni
Former United States citizens
International Olympic Committee members